Ketubot is a tractate of the Mishnah and the Talmud in the order of Nashim. It deals with a variety of marital responsibilities, especially those intended for the marital contract, also named the ketubah. Due to the wide breadth of subjects discussed in this tractate, Ketubot is often referred to as the Shas katan (the miniature Talmud).

A ketubah (plural: ketubot) (in Hebrew: כְּתוּבָּה; plural: כְּתוּבּוׂת) is a special type of Jewish prenuptial agreement. It is considered an integral part of a traditional Jewish marriage, and describes the groom's rights and responsibilities towards the bride. Currently, the ketubah does not have a monetary value, however, it has legal value in Israel.

Chapter headings 
 Betulah Niset
 Ha'isha Shennit'armelah
 Elu Nearot
 Na'arah shenitpatetah
 Af al pi she'amru
 Metziat ha'ishah
 Hamadir et Ishto
 Ha'ishah Shennafelu
 Hakotev Le'ishto
 Mi Sh' Nasuy
 Almanah Nizonet
 Hanose Et Ha'ishah
 Shnei Dayanei Gezeros

See also 
 Ketubah

References

External links
 The William Davidson Edition of the Talmud on Sefaria

Talmud
Jewish marital law